The 1988 Benson & Hedges Championships was a men's tennis tournament played on indoor carpet courts at the Wembley Arena in London, England that was part of the 1988 Nabisco Grand Prix. It was the 13th edition of the tournament and was held from 8 November until 13 November 1988. Fourth-seeded Jakob Hlasek won the singles title.

Finals

Singles
 Jakob Hlasek defeated  Jonas Svensson 6–7, 3–6, 6–4, 6–0, 7–5
 It was the first singles title of Hlasek's career.

Doubles
 Ken Flach /  Robert Seguso defeated  Martin Davis /  Brad Drewett 7–5, 6–2

References

External links
 ITF tournament edition details

Benson and Hedges Championships
Wembley Championships
Benson and Hedges Championships
Benson and Hedges Championships
Benson and Hedges Championships